Athinodoros Prousalis or Proussalis (15 December 1926 – 5 June 2012) was a Greek film and television actor.  He was born in İstanbul, Turkey.

Filmography

Television

References

External links

Greek male actors
Constantinopolitan Greeks
Turkish emigrants to Greece
1926 births
2012 deaths
Male actors from Istanbul
Actors from Piraeus